Dahl Creek Airport  is a state owned, public use airport located 10 nautical miles (19 km) southeast of Dahl Creek, in the Northwest Arctic Borough of the U.S. state of Alaska.

The National Plan of Integrated Airport Systems for 2011–2015 categorized it as a general aviation facility. As per the Federal Aviation Administration records, this airport had 92 passenger boardings (enplanements) in calendar year 2008, 10 enplanements in 2009, and 51 in 2010.

Facilities 
Dahl Creek Airport covers an area of 13 acres (5 ha) at an elevation of 260 feet (79 m) above mean sea level. It has one runway designated 8/26 with a gravel surface measuring 4,780 by 75 feet (1,457 x 23 m).

References

External links
 FAA Alaska airport diagram (GIF)
 Topographic map from USGS The National Map

Airports in Northwest Arctic Borough, Alaska
Airports in the Arctic